Jumel is a surname. Notable people with the surname include:

Betty Jumel (1901–1990), British variety hall entertainer and actress
Eliza Jumel (1775–1865), American socialite
Sébastien Jumel (born 1971), French politician